Ungmennafélag Grindavíkur, commonly known as UMFG or Grindavík, is a multi-sport club in Grindavík, Iceland. It has active departments of football, basketball, judo,  swimming, taekwondo and gymnastic.

Basketball

Men's basketball

The Grindavíks men's basketball team has won three national championships, the last one coming in 2013.

Titles
Úrvalsdeild karla: 3:
1995-96, 2011–12, 2012–13
Icelandic Cup: 5:
1995, 1998, 2000, 2006, 2014

Women's basketball

The Grindavíks women's basketball team won its lone national championship in 1997.

Titles
Úrvalsdeild kvenna: 1:
1996-97
Icelandic Cup: 2:
2008, 2015

Football
Grindavík men's and women's teams play their home games at Grindavíkurvöllur.

Men's football

Trophies and achievements
Icelandic League Cup: 1:
2000

Women's football

References

External links
 Official site
EUROBasket: UMF Grindavík basketball team
 KKÍ: Grindavík - kki.is

 
Multi-sport clubs in Iceland

de:Ungmennafélag Grindavíkur
fr:UG Grindavík
is:Ungmennafélag Grindavíkur
lt:UMF Grindavík
nl:UMF Grindavík
sv:Ungmennafélag Grindavíkur